Steenberghe is a Dutch and Belgian surname that may refer to
Florentine Steenberghe (born 1967), Dutch field hockey midfielder
Jan Van Steenberghe (born 1972), Belgian football goalkeeper
Johan Van Steenberghe (born 1956), Belgian Olympic swimmer
Max Steenberghe (1899–1972), Dutch politician

See also
Steenberg (surname)
Steenbergen (surname)

Dutch-language surnames